Paul Voell (26 July 1935 – 27 February 2004) was a German swimmer. He competed at the 1956 Summer Olympics and the 1960 Summer Olympics.

References

External links
 

1935 births
2004 deaths
German male swimmers
Olympic swimmers of the United Team of Germany
Swimmers at the 1956 Summer Olympics
Swimmers at the 1960 Summer Olympics
Sportspeople from Neuss